Irina Pankina (born March 8, 1986, Mayachny, Kumertau) is a Russian politician and a deputy of the 8th State Duma. 

In 2007, Pankina started working as a legal adviser at the Sberbank branch in Ufa. From 2009 to 2010, she was the leading specialist at the Plenipotentiary Representation of the Republic of Bashkortostan of the President of the Russian Federation. In 2011, she started working in the apparatus of the State Duma. Since September 2021, she has served as deputy of the 8th State Duma.

She is one of the members of the State Duma the United States Treasury sanctioned on 24 March 2022 in response to the 2022 Russian invasion of Ukraine.

References

1986 births
Living people
United Russia politicians
21st-century Russian politicians
Eighth convocation members of the State Duma (Russian Federation)
Bashkir State University alumni
People from Bashkortostan
Russian individuals subject to the U.S. Department of the Treasury sanctions